Eric Ferguson may refer to:

 Eric Ferguson (politician) (1930–2006), Canadian politician
 Eric Ferguson (footballer) (born 1965), former Scottish footballer
 Eric Ferguson (rugby league) (born 1955), Australian rugby league footballer
 Eric Ferguson (radio personality) (born 1967), American radio personality